China Communications Services Corporation Limited, known as China Comservice, is a subsidiary of China Telecommunications Corporation. It is engaged in providing telecommunication infrastructure services and outsourcing services to telecommunication operators and government organizations in China.

CCS was incorporated in the People's Republic of China in 2006. As a part of the restructuring, China Telecom Group transferred its telecommunication support businesses in Shanghai, Zhejiang, Fujian, Hubei, Guangdong and Hainan to CSS.CCS's H shares were listed on the Hong Kong Stock Exchange in 2006 and they were admitted to the Hang Seng China Enterprises Index from 2007 to 2010.

See also
List of telephone operating companies

References

External links
China Communications Services Corporation Limited

Companies listed on the Hong Kong Stock Exchange
Telecommunications equipment vendors
Government-owned companies of China
Chinese companies established in 2006
H shares
Telecommunications companies established in 2006